Casos de Família is a Brazilian television talk show produced and broadcast by SBT since May 18, 2004. Currently, is hosted by Christina Rocha, who had replaced Regina Volpato in 2009, when the show's format has been reformulated.

Format 
Casos de Família presents daily themes that will highlight the emotions of the participants on the stage, the invited audience and the viewers who are at home. In addition to the guests, the audience also actively participates in the show with opinions and questions about the stories told. The intention is to guide and even solve the cases presented with the participation of a psychologist.

After 4 years in charge of Casos de Família, Regina Volpato stated that she would not renew the contract for personal reasons, and would take over the program until the end of her contract with the station, which won on February 28, 2009. It was speculated that the reason for the departure of Regina Volpato would be the implantation of the Venezuelan "¿Quién tiene la razón?"format in the show, where people literally discuss the topics that have to be addressed, and in this one would have the famous "heated debate", besides "intense verbal conflicts" and dealing with embarrassing situations

History 
In 2004, SBT acquired the format from Venevisión, and hired journalist Regina Volpato (formerly Fundação Roberto Marinho and BandNews) to lead it. She hosted Casos de Família between May 18, 2004 and February 27, 2009.

References

External links 
 

Sistema Brasileiro de Televisão original programming
2004 in Brazilian television
Brazilian television talk shows